Brockman's rock mouse, or Brockman's myomyscus (Ochromyscus brockmani) is a species of rodent in the family Muridae.
It is found in Central African Republic, Ethiopia, Kenya, Somalia, Sudan, Tanzania, Uganda, and possibly Republic of the Congo.
Its natural habitats are dry savanna and rocky areas.

References

Ochromyscus
Mammals described in 1908
Taxa named by Oldfield Thomas
Taxonomy articles created by Polbot
Taxobox binomials not recognized by IUCN